Unmanned systems of the British Army is a list of all modern and in service remote and unmanned surveillance, reconnaissance, bomb disposal and combat systems of the British Army.

Unmanned vehicles

Black Hornet Nano

The Black Hornet Nano UAV measures 10 cm x 2.5 cm and provides troops with local situational awareness. The Black Hornet is equipped with three cameras which gives troops reliable full-motion video and still images it can be used to peer around corners or over walls and other obstacles to identify any hidden dangers and the images are displayed on a handheld terminal.

A total of 324 drones have been purchased and are deployed in units of 2. They are planned to be retained post draw down from Afghanistan These were withdrawn from British Army service in 2016/2017. However they were reintroduced into service from 2019 following an order for 30 placed in 2018.

Desert Hawk

The Desert Hawk, in service with 32nd Regiment Royal Artillery, allows for local area reconnaissance and base perimeter protection. Made of a lightweight material, it is capable of rough landings without major damage and is driven by a pusher quiet propeller. Equipped with three cameras, it can transmit real time video to a small laptop carried by the operators.

There are 1,222 individual Desert Hawk UAV's in service, with 12 support systems. Within Afghanistan they have flown 27,500 combined hours in service. They are planned to be retained post draw down from Afghanistan

Tarantula Hawk

The Tarantula Hawk, in service with 47th Regiment Royal Artillery, is a lightweight robot used primarily for situational awareness and IED detection from the air or close to the ground. They are most commonly mounted on Mastiff's under the variant "Protected Eyes" that also includes an ISTAR periscope and remote weapon system. This is part of the Talisman mine detection program and, upon locating a suspected area, the Mastiff will remotely deploy the Tarantula Hawk to investigate ahead of the convoy. Five systems were ordered initially for testing before many more were acquired upon successful integration into Talisman.

There are 18 T-Hawks in service with the Talisman Convoys. They have been moved into the core budget for Army 2020 as part of Talisman.

Dragon Runner

Dragon Runner is a lightweight, man portable, robot capable of detecting a variety of explosive devices without putting the operator in danger, which helps bomb disposal experts find and deactivate improvised explosive devices (IEDs). The version purchased is tracked, with a controllable manipulation arm and a very rugged design to be thrown from vehicles, over fences and through windows without damage.

Around 100 were purchased for use in the British Army.

Mini MineWolf MW240

The Mini MineWolf MW240 is a light, remote-controlled de-mining machine which is easily transported to remote areas. It is designed to operate in challenging environments and withstand blasts from Anti-Tank, Anti-Personnel and fragmentation mines. It offers a choice of tiller or flail operations depending on conditions with continuous ground penetration up to a depth of 25 cm, with automatic depth control. It has an average clearance performance 5,000m² – 12,000m² per day.

The British Army purchased 10 such items.

Talon

Talon is an EOD robotic unit used for investigating, identifying and deactivating improvised explosive devices. Developed by Qinetiq, they have been purchased for use with the Talisman convoys and explosive disposal units. Two accompany each of the six Talisman convoys, for at least 12 known to be in service.

Watchkeeper

Wheelbarrow Mk8

Wheelbarrow has been in use with the British Army since The Troubles and is now in the Mk8 development. They are used for investigating, identifying and deactivating improvised explosive devices. They can be remote controlled from up to 1 km away, climb 45 degree slopes and have a 150 kg lifting power. They can also be equipped with a shotgun attachment, laser designator, ceramic cutter, X-ray, disruptor brackets and many more modules. The Mk8 has been spotted on operational deployment in service with Talisman units.

Obsolete unmanned systems
BAE Systems Phoenix
Canadair CL-89 Midge
Radio BTT, OQ-19 Observer, Northrop MQM-57 Falconer

See also
Modern equipment of the British Army
British unmanned aerial vehicles of World War I

References

External links
 Equipment - British Army - Official British Army website managed by the Ministry of Defence.

British Army equipment